Alejandro Rangel Segovia (born 29 August 1962) is a Mexican politician affiliated with the PRI.   he served as Deputy of the LXII Legislature of the Mexican Congress representing Guanajuato.

References

1962 births
Living people
Politicians from Guanajuato
Institutional Revolutionary Party politicians
21st-century Mexican politicians
Members of the Congress of Guanajuato
Deputies of the LXII Legislature of Mexico
Members of the Chamber of Deputies (Mexico) for Guanajuato